We Need Medicine is the third studio album released by rock band The Fratellis, and the first since their 2012 reunion. It was released on 7 October 2013 in the UK, with a US release the following day.

The record stalled at #26 on the UK Albums Chart, marking a significant decline in popularity for the band whose first two albums went Top 5, and dropped out of the Top 100 altogether after just one week.

Chart performance
The album peaked at number 26 in their native UK album chart, significantly lower than their previous two albums, which had both peaked in the Top 5, it was a minor number 53 in Japan, and peaked at number 106 in the US compared with number 80 with previous album Here We Stand.

Track listing

Personnel

Band
 Jon Fratelli – Guitar, piano and vocals
 Barry Fratelli – Bass guitar
 Mince Fratelli – Drums

Additional musicians
 Will Foster - Piano and Keys on "Whiskey Saga" and "Until She Saves My Soul"
 Ryan Quigley - Trumpet on "This Old Ghost Town", "She's Not Gone Yet But She's Leaving" and "Until She Saves My Soul"
 Paul Towndrow - Saxophone on "She's Not Gone Yet But She's Leaving" and "Until She Saves My Soul"
 Deek McGee - Saxophone on "Halloween Blues"

Production
 Jon Fratelli and Stuart McCredie - Producer
 Stuart McCredie - Mixing engineer

Artwork
 Dan Porter

Reception

Critical reaction to We Need Medicine centred on the mean, but the record had ardent supporters. Heather Phares in Allmusic wrote: "While a few songs wander too close to lunkheaded bar rock, We Need Medicine reveals a surprising amount of vitality and growth for a band that spent nearly half a decade apart. Not only is it a welcome return, it’s one of The Fratellis’ most consistently engaging albums." In his review for PopMatters, Charles Pitter said: "The music is thorough, raucously ragged, and the lyrics forceful… The Fratellis are quirky, and you almost have to accept that not everything will work to get to the moments of genius." Mojo, in a mildly positive review, described the record as 'simple and uncomplicated' but 'fundamentally predictable'. John D. Luerssen of Rolling Stone lauded the album's first two singles, "Seven Nights, Seven Days" and "This Old Ghost Town".

Conversely, the record was battered by Alan Ashton-Smith in musicOMH, who wrote: "The Fratellis certainly sound like a more mature band now: the problem is that rather than sounding like a group who have grown to maturity, they sound like the kind of mature band that have reformed to plod their way around the stadium and festival circuit once they’ve reached the wrong side of middle age… if this is a band that needs medicine then what they ought to be prescribed is medicine for the soul." Paul Faller, in a scathing review for Drowned in Sound, suggested that the band retire after completing any associated live shows. He opined: "You can look at this album in two ways—it’s completely inessential at best, or a cynical cash-grab at worst. It’ll be enough to keep The Fratellis ticking over with tours and festival appearances for at least a little while, but We Need Medicine is no Panacea—and once it has run its course, it seems like it’d be more humane for the members of The Fratellis to just let the band die in peace."

The Soul Crush EP

After their tour in support of We Need Medicine the band released a free EP via their website called The Soul Crush EP which consisted of three new songs. The EP has never been commercially released and is no longer available to download via the band's website.

References

External links
We Need Medicine at Metacritic
We Need Medicine at AnyDecentMusic?

2013 albums
The Fratellis albums